Chariaspilates is a monotypic moth genus in the family Geometridae erected by Eugen Wehrli in 1953. Its only species, Chariaspilates formosaria, was first described by Eduard Friedrich Eversmann in 1837. It is found in swampy areas from Europe to Japan.

The wingspan is 38–43 mm for females and 31–37 mm for males. Adults are on wing primarily in June and July. Sometimes, a second generation may occur, which is known as C. formosaria f. autumnalis. Adults of this generation are on wing in September or October.

The larvae feed on Myrica gale, Lysimachia vulgaris and Caltha palustris. Larvae can be found from August to May of the following year, when pupation takes place.

Subspecies
 Chariaspilates formosaria formosaria
 Chariaspilates formosaria andriana Dannehl, 1921
 Chariaspilates formosaria pannonicus Vojnits, 1977

References

External links

"07918 Chariaspilates formosaria (Eversmann, 1837) - Moorwiesen-Striemenspanner". Lepiforum e.V. Retrieved April 11, 2019.

Moths described in 1837
Aspitatini
Moths of Japan
Insects of Europe
Taxa named by Eduard Friedrich Eversmann
Monotypic moth genera